Scott Phillip Randall (born October 29, 1975) is an American former professional baseball pitcher. Randall's Major League Baseball (MLB) career began in June 1995 when he was drafted by the Colorado Rockies in the 11th round of the Major League Baseball draft. He was later traded to the Minnesota Twins for outfielder and switch hitter Chris Latham. Randall went on to play for the Texas Rangers and both the Rockies and Twins for a second time before his MLB debut with the Cincinnati Reds. He appeared in 15 games for the Cincinnati Reds.  Randall's final Major League game took place on September 28, 2003 with the Cincinnati Reds.

Before joining the major leagues, Randall played for Santa Barbara City College’s baseball team, The Vaqueros, in 1995.

References

External links

1975 births
Living people
American expatriate baseball players in Canada
Asheville Tourists players
Baseball players from California
Carolina Mudcats players
Cincinnati Reds players
Colorado Springs Sky Sox players
Edmonton Trappers players
Louisville Bats players
Major League Baseball pitchers
New Britain Rock Cats players
New Haven Ravens players
Oklahoma RedHawks players
Omaha Royals players
Portland Rockies players
Salem Avalanche players
Salt Lake Buzz players
Santa Barbara City Vaqueros baseball players
Sportspeople from Fullerton, California
Tulsa Drillers players